Sevdalin Minchev Angelov (born July 25, 1974 in Gorna Oryahovitsa, Veliko Tarnovo) is a retired male weightlifter from Bulgaria. He is a four-time Olympian (1992, 1996, 2000 and 2004). Minchev is a 1996 Atlanta Olympics bronze medalist, four-time European champion, seven-time European vice-champion, world vice-champion and four-time world bronze medalist. Sevdalin is also a world champion for juniors from Varna in 1992 and second in the world a year later. He is a four-time European Junior Champion from Varna 1991, Cardiff 1992, Valencia 1993 and Rome 1994. He has 65 medals - 24 gold, 27 silver and 14 bronze, from the snatch, clean and jerk and total from World and European championships for men and juniors, and the Olympic Games, which is a record not only in Bulgarian weightlifting, but also in Bulgarian sports in general. During his career Minchev has set three world records - two for men and one for juniors. He has a long and successful career. Minchev started training in 1986 and he competed for only one club - Sliven. His personal trainer is Hristo Bachvarov. In the national team of Bulgaria he was coached by Ivan Abadjiev, Norair Nurikyan, Yordan Ivanov, Yanko Rusev, Plamen Asparuhov and Neno Terziisky. Minchev is the eight-time champion of Bulgaria - six times for men and two times for juniors.
At the 2000 Sidney Summer Olympics, Minchev was disqualified and his results nullified. 
Minchev tested positive for the banned diuretic furosemide. Sevdalin was stripped of his bronze medal.

References

External links
 Sports-reference (Retrieved on November 14, 2009).

Living people
1974 births
Bulgarian male weightlifters
Olympic weightlifters of Bulgaria
Olympic bronze medalists for Bulgaria
Weightlifters at the 1992 Summer Olympics
Weightlifters at the 1996 Summer Olympics
Weightlifters at the 2000 Summer Olympics
Weightlifters at the 2004 Summer Olympics
Bulgarian sportspeople in doping cases
Doping cases in weightlifting
Olympic medalists in weightlifting
Competitors stripped of Summer Olympics medals
Medalists at the 1996 Summer Olympics
European Weightlifting Championships medalists
World Weightlifting Championships medalists
People from Gorna Oryahovitsa
Sportspeople from Veliko Tarnovo Province
20th-century Bulgarian people